Félix Dafauce (13 November 1896 – 5 October 1990) was a Spanish film actor. He appeared in 120 films between 1925 and 1987. He was born and died in Madrid, Spain.

Selected filmography

 When the Angels Sleep (1947)
 Dawn of America (1951)
 Lola the Coalgirl (1952)
 Flight 971 (1953)
 Airport (1953)
 The Seducer of Granada (1953)
 The Devil Plays the Flute (1953)
I Was a Parish Priest (1953)
 All Is Possible in Granada (1954)
 Rebellion (1954)
 Judas' Kiss (1954)
 The Lost City (1955)
 Afternoon of the Bulls (1956)
 The Legion of Silence (1956)
 The Battalion in the Shadows (1957)
 Night and Dawn (1958)
 Back to the Door (1959)
 Where Are You Going, Alfonso XII? (1959)
 Plácido (1961)
 Rogelia (1962)
 The Secret of the Black Widow (1963)
 Two Mafiamen in the Far West (1964)
 The Complete Idiot (1970)
 All Is Possible in Granada (1982)
 The Autonomines (1984)

External links

1896 births
1990 deaths
Spanish male film actors
20th-century Spanish male actors
Male actors from Madrid